Aasal is a 2010 Indian Tamil-language ganster thriller film directed by Saran. The film stars Ajith Kumar in the lead role, who is also credited for the story, dialogues, screenplay and co-direction of the film, while Sameera Reddy and Bhavana play the lead female roles. The film has an extensive cast, with Prabhu, Pradeep Rawat, Sampath Raj and Rajiv Krishna playing prominent roles, among others. The film, produced by Prabhu of Sivaji Productions, features music primarily composed by Bharadwaj, cinematography by Prashanth D. Misale and editing by Anthony Gonsalves.

The film revolves around the feud between the three brothers over property; two brothers, from their father's first wife on one side with their avarice for all the wealth with the righteous third, from his father's second marriage, trying to stop the family from breaking down. The feud that exists as an undercurrent in the presence of their father and turns ugly and personal after he passes away. It grows bigger with the two brothers joining in to elbow out the third, but he graciously steps aside, only wanting to keep cordial relations. But, the two brothers are just not able to handle the huge wealth and the responsibility that it brings. Their wealth attracts trouble, and it is up to the third to come back and save his brothers, against others who strive for the wealth, while the crux of the plot revolves around if wealth does disintegrate the family.

Pre-production for the project began in December 2007 when Sivaji Productions signed up Ajith for a film; however, because of a bevvy of changes in the technical crew, shooting only began in April 2009. The filming took place in various locations: notably locally in Chennai, and abroad in Paris, Dubai and Kuala Lumpur. The film opened worldwide on 550 screens (including 350 screens in India) following its release on 5 February 2010.

Plot 
Jeevanandham is an international negotiator and arms dealer based in Paris. He has three sons: Sam and Vicky from his first wife, and Shiva (also Ajith) from his affair. Jeevanandham's favorite is Shiva, who is gutsy and righteous, while the other two are immature and controlled by their evil uncle Kali Mamma, and will do any shady deals.

Sarah is a cultural attaché at the Indian Embassy in Paris, and she has a soft spot for Shiva. A French police officer Daniel Dharmaraj, constantly hangs around with the family and is a partner in crime.

The bad sons want to deal in drugs and supply arms to terrorists; they work out a strategy to eliminate Shetty, who controls the Mumbai underworld, but Jeevanandham and Shiva oppose it. After Jeevanandham's death, Vicky is kidnapped by Shetty and his gang, who brutally torture him. To save Vicky, Shiva goes to Mumbai. His local contact there is Mirasi, his father's best friend. A local girl Sulabha, falls for our hero, who daringly rescues Vicky with the joker Don Samosa.

Both brothers double-cross Shiva, shoot him, and drown him in the sea. They torture Sarah and make her to sign as a witness that Shiva dies naturally. As per Jeevanandam's will, the property rights belong to Shiva, hence Sam and Vicky attempted to kill Shiva. With the help of Mirasi, Sulabha, and Don Samosa, everyone moves to France to find the real enemies. Sarah, who is being given drugs to forget Shiva's death and is also tortured by Vicky every day to accept his love, is found by Shiva and confesses everything to him. Vicky walks in and brutally beats Sarah. Shiva shoots him and interrogates him to find out the reason behind why the two brothers shot him. After Vicky refuses to say, Shiva shoots him on the spot and saves Sarah. Sam finds out about Vicky's death and suspects Daniel, but is subdued by Kali Mamma. Shiva slowly uncovers what happened through forcing and threatening the allies of Sam and Kali Mamma. Eventually, a drunk Don Samosa accidentally spills Shiva being alive to Daniel, who kidnaps Mirasi, Sulabha, and Sarah and holds them captive in a storage facility. Shiva is forced to surrender Jeevanandham's will to Kali Mamma and Sam, but delivers an empty suitcase instead. An infuriated Kali Mamma shoots Mirasi and Daniel, and Sam throws Shiva out a glass window and ties him up. After Shiva tells Sam to give up his arrogance, Sam and Kali Mamma reveal why and how they killed Jeevanandham.

Sam wanted to deal weapons to foreign terrorists and asked Jeevananandham to give money to aid them. After Jeevanandham tries reasoning to little avail, Kali Mamma walks in. After he refuses everyone's request to deal weapons and give his money, Kali Mamma electrocutes, and Sam suffocates Jeevanandham, killing him in the process. They do the same with Shiva after explaining, electrocuting him multiple times, but eventually, an enraged Shiva breaks the ropes he is tied to and engages in combat with Sam and Kali Mamma, electrocuting and killing both of them. Daniel, now a reformed, honest cop, brings Mirasi to Shiva, and tells him that he will take the blame for Sam and Kali Mamma's deaths by saying that he killed them in self-defense.

The film ends several months later with Shiva and Sulabha, now married, waving goodbye to Don Samosa, Sarah, and Mirasi, and leaving for India from Paris together.

Cast 

 Ajith Kumar as Shiva and Jeevanantham
 Prabhu as Mirasi
 Sameera Reddy as Sarah
 Bhavana as Sulabha Pillai
 Kelly Dorji as Brijesh Shetty
 Pradeep Rawat as Kalivardhan
 Sampath Raj as Sam
 Rajiv Krishna as Vicky
 Yugi Sethu as Don Samosa
 Suresh as Daniel Dharmaraj
 Karmanya Sapru as Lee
 Badhra as Don Samosa's sidekick
 Koena Mitra
 Yog Japee as Advocate
 Surendra Pal
 Balaji K. Mohan

Production

Preproduction 
Following the success of Billa in December 2007, Ajith Kumar was signed by Prabhu's Sivaji Productions for a project touted to be directed by K. S. Ravikumar. Three months later, the producers officially signed on Gautham Vasudev Menon as the director; Sameera Reddy, the female lead for Menon's last film, was also finalised for the project. Initially, the producer was considering Anushka Shetty as the female lead. The film, which was due to start its first schedule during June 2008, had been built up as the final installment in Gautham Vasudev Menon's police trilogy, following his two earlier ventures, Kaaka Kaaka and Vettaiyaadu Vilaiyaadu, of which Ajith was originally meant to be a part. However, other indications suggested that the film was set to be the remake of the classic, Pudhiya Paravai starring Sivaji Ganesan, which Ganesan's son, Prabhu, denied. The film had been earlier titled by the media as Kanavugal Karpanaigal or Vaanam Kadandha Siragugal, but the team then finalised the title of Surangani, which was later abbreviated to Sura. However, the film's production failed to take off, with repeated dates being announced by the directors for the film's first schedule throughout 2009. Subsequently, Menon was removed from the project by the producers due to the film's inactivity, with directors Dharani, Vishnuvardhan and Saran leading the race to take over.

Development 
In January 2009, the film was reannounced by Prabhu and the story was subsequently changed with Saran being signed up as the film's director. Ajith also underwent an appearance change during the early months of 2009 to prepare for his role. The film was eventually launched on 8 April 2009 at Sivaji's family residence Annai Illam in Chennai. The film completed its production schedule by January 2010, and post-production and release works began soon after.

Casting 
Following the announcement that Sivaji Productions, Ajith Kumar and Gautham Vasudev Menon would come together, other technicians were added to the film. Menon's usual collaborator, Harris Jayaraj, was signed on as the music composer. However, after Menon's departure, Jayaraj also left the project due to his busy schedule with other films. After approaching Yuvan Shankar Raja for the job, Saran finally confirmed Bharadwaj as music director. Asal was Bharadwaj's fiftieth film as composer; he had previously teamed up with Saran and Ajith on Kadhal Mannan, Amarkalam and Attagasam. Ajith was under contract to be paid a remuneration of $1.25 million in cash plus a 30 per cent share of the profit from sales of rights of the film.

During the launch in April 2009, other film technicians were revealed. Y-Kinz, an international music group, were announced to be a part of the music album for the film headed with Bharadwaj. Ajith himself had recommended Prashanth D. Misale, an assistant to Nirav Shah, to make his debut as a cinematographer. Anthony was selected as editor; Prabakar was chosen to work as the art director and Vairamuthu as the chief lyricist. Vivek Karunakaran, a Chennai-based fashion designer, was selected to make his debut as the film's costume designer. Soon after the launch, co-producer Prabhu cast himself to play an important role in the film. Gautham Menon's original choice, Sameera Reddy, was retained to star opposite Ajith in the film. Initially Anushka Shetty was considered for the role. Sameera appears alongside Ajith for the first time, despite previously being scheduled to appear opposite him in Citizen, which eventually went ahead without her. Mamta Mohandas was initially confirmed as the second heroine in Asal, but decided not to take the role. Sneha, Shriya Saran, newcomer Hansika Motwani and Bhavana were also approached for the second heroine's role, however Sneha was unable to comply due to call sheet problems, so Bhavana was finalised. A plethora of antagonistic roles were handed out for the film, with the initial selection being Rajiv Krishna. Other cast members are Pradeep Rawat, Kelly Dorji, Karen Miao Sapru, Adithya, Suresh, Sampath Raj, Surendra Pal and Yugi Sethu.

Filming 

Principal photography of the film began in June 2009 at an undisclosed location in Malaysia. The first schedule was completed on 2 August 2009. After a hectic schedule from Malaysia, the shooting for the second schedule continued on 18 September 2009 at Paris and Lyon, France. 30% of the scenes, including fight sequences and two song sequences, were canned there, including a duet song of Ajith and Sameera as pictured against the moonlit Eiffel Tower in Paris. After a 45-day shoot, the team returned to Chennai on 23 October 2009. Additional shooting was held in Harrington Road on 2 November. Asal's team later shot some of the important shots in AVM Studios. The film's dubbing schedule took off on 19 November at Four Frames Preview Theatre Chennai with a simple pooja ceremony. Ajith, Saran, Arjun (Prabhu's son), Dushyanth (Ramkumar's son) and other members of the film were present there. On 24 November 2009, an important scene for the film was shot at Sivaji Ganesan's house in T. Nagar, Chennai. A song sequence featuring Ajith and Bhavana was shot at the AVM Studios on 25 November 2009. The shooting of the final song was held at Binny Mills (Tambaram). The cast and crew of Asal went to a Middle East country for the remaining song shoot. The Asal unit left Chennai on 26 December and returned after a week. Shooting was finished on 31 December 2009 at Dubai, where a song sequence was filmed at Zabeel Park.

Release

Reception 
Made on a high budget, Asal opened to mixed reviews.

Critics cited that the film is strictly for Ajith fans and that it couldn't live up to its expectations, whilst also criticising its Billa hangover. Sify cited that the film, which "should have been called Billa-2", "falls flat due to lack of proper story and narration", adding, that the film "belongs to Ajith" and "it is a good ride if you keep your expectation meter low". A reviewer from Behindwoods gave the film 2 out of 5, claiming that this film "will gain no great interest". He adds that "Asal is a complete Ajith centric entertainer with lots of style and sophistication", that "the script is weak and there are other flaws too" and that "Ajith satisfies his fans, but Saran disappoints a bit with the way he has handled such a great team, better results were definitely on". Pavithra Srinivasan from Rediff gave the film 2 out of 5 as well, citing that the film is for "die-hard Ajith fans", who would have "plenty of reasons to rejoice", whilst the others should "leave their brains at home". The reviewer, like Sify, also adds that the film has a "Billa hangover".

Soundtrack 

The film's soundtrack was released on 4 January 2010. The soundtrack has music by Bharadwaj & Y-Kinz with lyrics by Vairamuthu. The audio distribution rights were given to Ayngaran Music and An Ak Audio. Think Music, an association of Sathyam Cinemas and Hungama Technology. The audio was launched at Sivaji Ganesan's house in T Nagar, Chennai by Prabhu, one of the producers, and was received by Ajith.

References

External links 

2010 films
2010s Tamil-language films
Films directed by Saran
Films scored by Bharadwaj (composer)
Indian action thriller films
2010 action thriller films
Films shot in Malaysia
Films shot in Dubai
Films shot in Kuala Lumpur
Films set in Paris
Films shot in Paris
Films set in Mumbai